Cota is a genus belonging to the chamomile tribe within the sunflower family. It is native to Europe, North Africa, and southwestern Asia, with a few species naturalized elsewhere. It is an herbaceous plant with flower heads including white or yellow ray florets and yellow disc florets.

Species

References

External links 

Asteraceae genera
Anthemideae